Boulenophrys wuliangshanensis, commonly known as the Wuliangshan horned toad, is a species of frog found in eastern Asia. It has been found in Yunnan province in China and the state of Nagaland in India and it is thought to occur in Myanmar (Burma), although there are no records from there as yet. Its specific name refers to its type location, Mount Wuliang in Jingdong County.

It is a rare species. Currently its IUCN Red List classification is Data Deficient.

References

Boulenophrys
Frogs of India
Amphibians of China
Amphibians described in 1995